On 6 June 2022, a bus carrying 55 passengers as a part of a marriage ceremony fell into the 500-metre-deep gorge at night near Simdi village in Dhumakot area Uttarakhand. 32 people were killed and the rest were heavily injured in the accident. The bus was going from Laldhang in Haridwar district to Birkhal block of Pauri district.

Response
Officials from Dhumkot police station came to the spot soon after the incident was reported. Uttarakhand Chief Minister Pushkar Singh Dhami reached the State Disaster Management Center soon after he was informed about the accident. SDRF and NDRF teams carried out rescue operations and the injured people were shifted to the hospital. Prime minister Narendra Modi and defence Minister Rajnath Singh expressed their condolences after the incident. Dhami announced financial assistance of Rs 2 lakh each for the next of kin of the deceased and of Rs 50,000 for the injured.

References

2022 disasters in India
2022 road incidents